Edmund Lechmere (4 April 1710 – 29 March 1805) was a British politician, MP for Worcestershire 1734–1747.

Lechmere was the son of Anthony Lechmere  (1710–1805), and the nephew of Nicholas Lechmere, 1st Baron Lechmere, Attorney General.

He was educated by Mr. Vaslett at Fulham, and matriculated at Trinity College, Cambridge in 1728.

He served as High Sheriff of Worcestershire in 1732–33.

Horace Walpole described Lechmere as "a great grazier and a mere country squire". Unlike his father and his uncle, he was a Tory, who consistently voted against the Whig government.

Lechmere and Sir Herbert Pakington, Bt were elected unopposed for Worcestershire in 1734; Lechmere and fellow Tory Edmund Pytts defeated two Whigs in 1741. Lechmere did not stand in 1747.

He died on 29 March 1805, a few days short of his 95th birthday, and was buried at Hanley on 5 April 1805.

Family
Lechmere married firstly, on 12 October 1732, Elizabeth daughter of Sir Blunden Charlton, 3rd Bt. They had two sons:
 Nicholas Lechmere  (1733–1807), adopted the additional surname Charlton in 1784
 Edmund Lechmere  (1747–1798)

He married secondly, on 4 June 1765, Elizabeth daughter of Rev. John Whitmore. They had one son:
 Sir Anthony Lechmere, 1st Bt. (1766–1849), created a baronet in 1818

References

1710 births
1805 deaths
Alumni of Trinity College, Cambridge
British MPs 1734–1741
British MPs 1741–1747
Tory members of the Parliament of Great Britain
Members of the Parliament of Great Britain for Worcestershire